Ranta is a Finnish language surname meaning "shore" or "beach". Ranta may also refer to:
Aulis Ranta-Muotio (born 1946), Finnish politician
Esko Ranta (born 1947), Finnish footballer
Helena Ranta (born 1946), Finnish forensic dentist
Kristian Ranta (born 1981), Finnish heavy metal guitarist
Maarit Feldt-Ranta (1968-2019), Finnish politician
Roope Ranta (born 1988), Finnish ice hockey player
Sampo Ranta (born 2000), Finnish ice hockey player
Vesa Ranta (born 1973), Finnish drummer
Ville Ranta (born 1978), Finnish visual artist
Ranta, a village in Bogata Commune, Mureș County, Romania

Finnish-language surnames